Brainerd International Raceway is a road course, and dragstrip racing complex northwest of the city of Brainerd, Minnesota. The complex has a  dragstrip, and overlapping  and  road courses. The complex also includes a kart track. The raceway hosts the National Hot Rod Association's Lucas Oil Nationals. It is a popular racetrack for the Trans Am Series. The spectator seating capacity of the circuit is 20,000.

History
Opened in July 1968 as Donnybrooke Speedway, there were no safety barriers, run-out areas, grandstands or even restrooms. George Montgomery and Bud Stall cleared the racetrack through a wooded area on the south side of North Long Lake. It was SCCA's first venue in the region. It was also an NHRA-sanctioned track, with the first official event there an NHRA race, at the opening; Top Fuel Dragster was won by Doc Halladay. With the help of St Paul sports promoter Dennis Scanlan, it hosted a 2-heat USAC Indy Car race in 1969. The heats were won by Gordon Johncock and Dan Gurney.

Donnybrooke, played host to CanAm races in 1970, 1971, and 1972. These races were won by, respectively, Denny Hulme, Peter Revson, and François Cevert. In 1973 Jerry Hansen bought the track and renamed it Brainerd International Raceway.

In the 1970s, the Donnybrooke track began holding Funny Car events, in particular the Crown Auto Funny Car Championships, and in time, NHRA was convinced to stage a national event at Brainerd:  in 1982, Shirley Muldowney (in Top Fuel Dragster), Frank Hawley (Top Fuel Funny Car), and Lee Shepherd (Pro Stock) were the headline winners at the first Quaker State North Star NHRA Nationals.

In Pro Stock, Bob Glidden won at Brainerd in 1983, 1985, 1986, and 1992.

The Brainerd strip became known as "one of the quickest and fastest in the world". It was completely resurfaced in 2003.

Kenny Bernstein won at Brainerd five times, 1983 and 1987 (in Top Fuel Funny Car) and in 1991, 1996, and 2002 (in Top Fuel Dragster)).

In the summer of 2006, Jed and Kristi Copham of Forest Lake, Minnesota, became the new owners of Brainerd International Raceway.

The track hosted two NASCAR K&N Pro Series West events between 2012 and 2013. The track also hosted one NASCAR Midwest Series race in 2004.

Brainerd International Raceway was damaged during a severe thunderstorm that struck portions of Minnesota on July 12, 2015.

Track Information
Brainerd International Raceway consists of 2 road tracks and 1 drag strip.

Donnybrooke Road Course
Brainerd International Raceway maintains the original name of the now 50-year-old course.  The course is used for automotive and motorcycle racing.

There is essentially no elevation change. There are wide runoff areas at most of the corners, which makes BIR's road course extremely safe. This configuration uses the dragstrip as part of the course.

Competition Road Course
The 2009 racing season was the first for the  course which was completed in the 2008 summer.

Turn 1 on the  Competition Road Course is the same as Turn 1 on the three-mile road course. Turn 1 is a narrow but very high-speed banked right-hand 60-degree turn, which is intended be taken flat out by all vehicles. Turns 1 through 8 of the original  road course are used for the new circuit. At Turn 8, a 240-degree right-hand Clover Leaf transitions drivers from the old course to the new stretch of asphalt that winds its way back across the infield, eventually tying back into the original circuit just before Turn 1, avoiding the dragstrip. In all, the Competition Road Course features 13 turns and very little elevation change.

Dragstrip
The dragstrip dates back to 1969, when Donnybrooke converted the mile-long straightaway on its road course to a drag strip and hosted an NHRA Divisional Points Race. In 1977, BIR hosted the Crown Auto Funny Car Championships and the Crown Auto Winston Points Championship. It was reconstructed in 2005, adding a  concrete launch pad and new asphalt for the remaining 600 feet was installed.
Tony Schumacher, set the world record for top fuel dragsters with a  run in 2005. This speed and time are recorded at the end of a standing start quarter mile acceleration race, before the NHRA shortened top fuel and funny car races to the current  since 2008.

Lap records

As of July 2022, the fastest official race lap records at the Brainerd International Raceway for different classes are listed as:

References

External links
 brainerdraceway.com Official website
 Circuit Photos Aerial Photos
 Trackpedia guide to Brainerd including videos with telemetry and track notes

Buildings and structures in Crow Wing County, Minnesota
Motorsport venues in Minnesota
NHRA Division 5 drag racing venues
Superbike World Championship circuits
IMSA GT Championship circuits
NASCAR tracks
Tourist attractions in Crow Wing County, Minnesota
Brainerd, Minnesota
Road courses in the United States
Drag racing venues
1968 establishments in Minnesota
Sports venues completed in 1968